The Prince's Progress and Other Poems is Christina Rossetti's second volume of poetry, published by Macmillan in 1866. Christina's brother Dante Gabriel Rossetti designed the illustrations and bindings for the publication, just as he had for her first volume, Goblin Market and Other Poems. The Prince's Progress tells the story of a princess awaiting the return of her prince. After tarrying due to a series of temptations and self-indulgences, the prince returns only to find that the princess has died. Dante Gabriel Rossetti's frontispiece illustration depicts the grief-stricken prince upon hearing the news of his princesse's death; the title illustration depicts the princess staring longingly out the window as she waits for her prince to return. The 1866 edition contains 46 poems in addition to "The Prince's Progress."

Dante Gabriel Rossetti disagreed with the gaudy ornamentation of many Victorian books, and thus attempted to refine the heavily ornamented book with his own bindings. In this publication, he employs a combination of minimalist motifs and contemporary technology, seen specifically in the gold stamping. The hand and machine work of this design ensured the perpetuation of Rossetti’s aesthetic through wider accessibility.

The gold design makes reference to clasps and nailheads on medieval books, and it is repeated on both the cover and back of the book. In conjunction with the wood-engraved illustrations, this binding has an integrated role in the art of the book as a whole. In addition to the medieval allusion, the organic motifs reflect the theme of growth and change within the text. In this way, the binding becomes a part of the narrative.

Poems include:
The Prince's Progress
Maiden-Song
Jessie Cameron
Spring Quiet
The Poor Ghost
A Portrait
Dream-Love
Twice
Songs in a Cornfield
A Year's Windfalls
The Queen of Hearts
One Day
A Bird's-Eye View
Light Love
A Dream
A Ring Posy
Beauty Is Vain
Lady Maggie
What Would I Give?
The Bourne
Summer
Autumn
The Ghost'S Petition
Memory
A Royal Princess
Shall I Forget?
Vanity of Vanities
L. E. L.
Life and Death
Bird or Beast?
Eve
Grown and Flown
A Farm Walk
Somewhere or Other
A Chill
Child's Talk in April
Gone for Ever
Under the Rose
Devotional Pieces
Despised and Rejected
Long Barren
If Only
Dost Thou Not Care?
Weary in Well-Doing
Martyrs' Song
After This The Judgement
Good Friday
The Lowest Place

References

British poetry collections
Poetry by Christina Rossetti
1866 books